Fungal effectors are proteins or non-proteinaceous molecules (such as RNAs or small molecules) secreted by pathogenic fungi into a host organism in order to modulate the host's immune response.

Plant pathogenic fungi 
In the first stages of infection, conserved molecules from the fungal pathogen's cell wall, such as polysaccharides and chitin, are recognised by membrane-localised pattern recognition receptors (PRRs) on the plant host's side. Such conserved molecules are generally described as pathogen-associated molecular patterns (PAMPs) or microbe-associated molecular patterns (MAMPs) and the initial innate immune response that their recognition triggers is known as PAMP-triggered immunity (PTI).

In order to counteract PTI, fungal pathogens secrete effector proteins into the host, some of which may directly inhibit components of the innate immune response cascade. One example is the conserved effector NIS1, present in fungal pathogens from the Ascomycota and Basidiomycota phyla. NIS1 blocks PAMP-triggered immune responses by interacting with the PRR-associated kinases BAK1 and BIK1 and preventing these kinases from interacting with their downstream partners. To protect themselves from the actions of effector proteins, plants have evolved resistance proteins (R proteins), which may in turn recognise an effector and trigger a second tier of immune responses, known as effector-triggered immunity (ETI).

Site of action 
Plant pathogenic fungi use two distinct effector secretion systems and each secretory pathway is specific to an effector family:

 apoplastic effectors act in the apoplast, the extracellular space outside the host plant's cells. In the model pathogen Magnaporthe oryzae, apoplastic effectors are secreted into a distinct compartment enclosing the growing hypha named the EIHM (extra-invasive hyphal membrane).
 cytoplasmic effectors enter the host cells' cytoplasm. Cytoplasmic effectors of the pathogen Magnaporthe oryzae are accumulated into a complex plant-derived structure named the biotrophic interfacial complex (BIC) and they are later translocated across the EIHM inside the plant cell. It has been shown that cytoplasmic effectors can move through a few layers of plant cells, probably a way to prepare them for hyphal invasion.

Fungal pathogens

References 

Fungal proteins